The Type Two platform was a front wheel drive platform designed by the Italian Fiat Group and used during the late 1980s, 1990s and early 2000s for a range of Alfa Romeo, Fiat and Lancia models. It introduced the concept of a "modular" platform, albeit not as modular as current platforms are, allowing the group to assemble various models, also with some special modifications, from the same floorpan.
It uses four-wheel independent suspension, composed of MacPherson struts at the front and trailing arms at the rear, with Alfa Romeo Spider and GTV using a multilink setup rather than trailing arms.

The first generation Fiat C-platform was directly derived from this platform: it has only minor differences, and is also called "Type Two rev. 2". The Alfa Romeo 156 and Lancia Lybra platform is also derived from the Type Two rev. 2 platform and called "Type Two rev. 3", with stretched wheelbase and different suspension setups: MacPherson struts at the front and GLA (standing for "Guided Longitudinal Arms", "Bracci Longitudinali Guidati" in Italian) at the rear for the Lybra, double wishbones at the front and MacPherson struts at the rear for the Alfa.

The Type Three platform was merely a stretched version of the Type Two platform, intended for Fiat Group's saloons such as the Fiat Tempra, with an all-wheel drive system available.

Models
Alfa Romeo 145
Alfa Romeo 146
Alfa Romeo Spider
Alfa Romeo GTV
Lancia Delta
Fiat Tipo
Fiat Coupé
Alfa Romeo Sportut concept

References

Fiat platforms
Alfa Romeo platforms
Lancia platforms